Takaharu (written: , , , , , , , ,  or ) is a masculine Japanese given name. Notable people with the name include:

, Japanese sumo wrestler
, Japanese archer
, Japanese judge
, Japanese middle-distance runner
, Japanese businessman and Shinto priest
, Japanese philatelist
, Japanese mixed martial artist
, Japanese speed skater
, Japanese kendoka
, Japanese footballer
, Japanese architect

Japanese masculine given names